Chrysosplenetin is an O-methylated flavonol. It can be found in the root of Berneuxia thibetica and in Chamomilla recutita.

References 

O-methylated flavonols